In The Meantime, In Between Time is a 1991 album released by pop group The Party.  The album features covers and remixes and was intended to
keep fans occupied until The Party finished their next album, but the EP took on a life of its own.  The cover of the Dokken song "In My Dreams" ended up being the band's biggest hit on the charts, peaking at #34 on the Billboard Hot 100 and #35 on the Billboard Hot Dance chart. "In My Dreams" would land the group an appearance on Club MTV, a return to MMC, another Disney Channel special entitled, Go Party!, and  another concert tour opening for Hi-Five.

Track listing
"In My Dreams" (Don Dokken, George Lynch, Jeff Pilson) - 3:35 - Deedee
"Private Affair" (Diane Warren) 4:14 - Albert
"Sugar Is Sweet" (Remix) (Billy Steinberg, Tom Kelly) - 3:53 - Deedee & Albert
"I Gotcha" (Albert Fields, Chase Hampton, Damon Pampolina) - 4:05 - Albert & Chase
"Adult Decision" (Remix) (Allee Willis, Danny Sembello) - 4:16 - Deedee
"(What's So Funny 'Bout) Peace, Love and Understanding?" (Nick Lowe) - 4:12 - Chase & Albert
"I Know What Boys Like" (Christopher Butler, Merovigian) - 3:49 - Tiffini
"Spiders and Snakes" (Jim Stafford, David Bellamy) - 3:40 - Damon
"That's Why" (Power Mix) (Stephen Bray, Linda Mallah) - 4:16 - Albert
"My Generation" (Pete Townshend) - 3:20 - Damon

References

The Party (band) albums
1991 EPs
Hollywood Records EPs
Albums produced by Julian Raymond